The Bram Stoker Award for Best Fiction Collection is an award presented by the Horror Writers Association (HWA) for "superior achievement" in horror writing for best fiction collection.

Winners and nominees
This category was previously titled "best collection". Nominees are listed below the winner(s) for each year.

References

External links
 Stoker Award on the HWA web page
 Graphical listing of all Bram Stoker award winners and nominees

Collection
Short story collection awards
1987 establishments in the United States
Awards established in 1987
English-language literary awards